Fitrul Dwi Rustapa (born 5 June 1995) is an Indonesian professional footballer who plays as a goalkeeper for Liga 1 club Persib Bandung.

Club career

Persegres Gresik United
In 2016, Fitrul signed a year contract with Persegres Gresik United. He made his league debut on 29 April 2017 in a match against Borneo at the Segiri Stadium, Samarinda.

Persipura Jayapura
He was signed for Persipura Jayapura to play in Liga 1 in the 2018 season. Fitrul made his debut on 10 September 2021 in a match against Persela Lamongan at the Wibawa Mukti Stadium, Cikarang.

Persib Bandung
Fitrul was signed for Persib Bandung to play in Liga 1 in the 2022–23 season. He made his league debut on 24 July 2022 in a match against Bhayangkara at the Wibawa Mukti Stadium, Cikarang.

Career statistics

Club

References

External links
 
 Fitrul Dwi Rustapa at Liga Indonesia

1995 births
Living people
Indonesian footballers
Persegres Gresik players
Gresik United players
Persipura Jayapura players
Persib Bandung players
Liga 1 (Indonesia) players
People from Garut
Sportspeople from West Java
Association football goalkeepers